Banca Akros is an Italian investment bank based in Milan, Italy. It is a subsidiary of the Italian Banco BPM bank. 

Banca Akros was founded by Gianmario Roveraro in Milan in 1997.

In 1998, Banca Akros became part of Banca Popolare di Milano.  After the 2017 merger of Banco Popolare di Milano with Banco Popolare, Banca Akros became part of the Banco BPM group.

References

External links
 

Italian brands
Banks established in 1997
Companies based in Milan
Italian companies established in 1997